Kemer is a seaside resort and district of Antalya Province on the Mediterranean coast of Turkey,  west of the city of Antalya, on the Turkish Riviera.

Kemer is on the Gulf of Antalya,  of sea coast with the skirts of the western Taurus Mountains behind. The coast has the typical Mediterranean hot, dry weather and warm sea. Until the early 1980s this was a quiet rural district, but today the town of Kemer and coastal villages in the district play a very important part in tourism in Turkey.

History

The name Kemer refers to those walls.

Before the population exchange between Greece and Turkey, Greek families lived in the area with the Turks of the area peacefully coexisting. A water mill still exists in the village of Aslanbucak that used to belong to the Greeks of the village of Kemer and Aslanbucak, but the mill is currently located in private property.

Until the 1960s there was no road connection and the district was accessible only by boat. Then a road was built and from the 1980s onwards this was followed by a great investment in infrastructure, planned by the state and funded by the World Bank, aimed at developing a large tourist industry.

Demographics
The district had a population of 36,010 according to the 2010 census. The town itself has 20,785 inhabitants. Kemer has four municipalities (Beldibi, Çamyuva, Göynük, Tekirova) and four villages.

The population of the towns and villages (municipality names are bold) are shown in the table below:

Economy
The economy of Kemer district is mostly based on tourism. In the district, which has been declared a first-degree tourism area, there are generally touristic businesses on the coast. Especially orange, lemon and tangerine are grown in the region where agriculture and fruit growing. Recently, pomegranate cultivation has also become widespread.

Tourism in Kemer

One of the major attractions of Kemer is its natural environment, including the sea, mountains and pine forests. The shore from Beldibi to Tekirova consists of a number of beaches in bays of various sizes, mostly stoney rather than sand.

Supported by transport and communication links, and related municipal services, Kemer has a large proportion of the hotel bed capacity of the Antalya region, and attracts visitors from countries such as Germany, the Netherlands, and in recent years families from Russia. Many of the visitors come as part of low-cost all-inclusive package deals but tourism is still the mainstay of the local economy. There are so many visitors that most shops in Kemer are set up to sell things like leather jackets to overseas visitors, and trade in the euro as well as the Turkish lira.

Kemer's 320 berth marina offers several restaurants for the tourists as well as being a wintering-over marina for liveaboard sailors from the US, England and other parts of Europe.

Göynük (Goynuk) Canyon, Ulupınar, Olympos, Chimaera, Phaselis, Three Islands and Eco Park are the touristic sites of the Kemer area.

The town of Kemer has a number of clubs, bars and restaurants, blue flag beaches and a 320 capacity yacht marina. Coastal villages include Beldibi, Kiriş, Çayova, Aslanbucak, Kuzdere, Beycik, Çamyuva, Göynük, and Çıralı.

Annual events in the area include art exhibitions in Phaselis, boat races, WRC (World Rally Championship), Turkey Offshore Championship, Turkey Motocross Championship, Phaselis Art Festival, and Kemer Carnival. International pop stars and DJs, such as Tarkan and DJ Tiesto, give summer concerts on this coast.

The Presidential Cycling Tour of Turkey is a professional road bicycle racing stage race held each spring.

In recent years there is a rising number of outdoor enthusiasts visiting Kemer for trekking the Lycian Way and for mountain biking.

Climate
Kemer has a hot Mediterranean climate with very hot, long and dry summers with cool, rainy winters. In the height of summer temperatures frequently exceed .

Transport
Kemer Bus Terminal, which was put into operation in 1990, has facilitated the transportation of the district. There are bus services to Kemer Bus Terminal from almost every city in Turkey. There are regular shuttles from the surrounding districts to Kemer Bus Station every day.

Places of interest

Sites of natural interest
 Adrasan Bay - 2 kilometres of beach
 The Çıralı village and  beach. Used for nature walks and sections of the Lycian Way.
 Üç Adalar (Three Islands) - visited by scuba divers
 Göynük Canyon
 İkiz Kayalar (Twin Rocks)
 The village of Ulupınar, with its mountain spring water
 There are a number of caves including Beldibi, and the Molla hole in the east face of Tahtalı mountain.
 The Taurus Mountains offering hiking or tours with SUVs
 The 2069 ± 500 years old oriental pane can be found in Gedelme village.

Historical sites
 Chimaera - the natural burning rock of Greek mythology
 The ancient cities of Phaselis and Olympos
 The town of Kemer itself has some remains of antique Idryos, a Byzantine church and a Seljuk Turkish hunting lodge.

International relations

Kemer hosted the 2007 World Youth Chess Championship

Twin towns — Sister cities
Kemer is twinned with
 Schwabach, Germany (since 1998)
 Lapta, Northern Cyprus (since 2012)

References

External links
 Kemer
 Kemer Municipality website
 Kemer Tourism Foundation official website
 Detailed information source on Kemer
 Kemer Travel Guide
 Weather forecast for 4 days
 Kemer Marina website
 Kemer bus companies

Antalya
Towns in Turkey
Turkish Riviera
Populated coastal places in Turkey
Populated places in Antalya Province
Tourist attractions in Antalya Province
Kemer District
Districts of Antalya Province